Cosmarium botrytis is a species of green algae in the family Desmidiaceae. It is a freshwater species with a worldwide distribution, and has been recorded from all continents.

Taxonomy 
Cosmarium botrytis, along with other similar Cosmarium species, displays a large amount of morphological variation. Many varieties have been described.

References 

Desmidiaceae
Plants described in 1848